Roads is the debut studio album by American recording artist Chris Mann, released on October 30, 2012, by Universal Republic. Mann participated in the season two of the singing reality show The Voice, ultimately placing fourth, but being the first of the second season to release an album. The album was produced by Keith Thomas, Marco Marinangeli, Marius de Vries, Walter Afanasieff and others.

"Roads" is a vocal pop, classical crossover and traditional pop album, with covers from Lady Antebellum, Damien Rice, Coldplay and Frank Sinatra, as well as new songs. It also features classic covers, such as "Always on My Mind" and "Ave Maria". The album also features vocals from his coach on The Voice, the American recording artist Christina Aguilera.

Background 

A classically trained singer, Chris Mann came to the public's attention while appearing as a contestant on the second season of NBC's singing reality show The Voice in 2012. However, Mann had already released 2 self-titled extended plays, the first being in 2009 and the second in 2011. While auditioning for The Voice, Mann was initially chosen by judges Christina Aguilera and CeeLo Green after singing Andrea Bocelli's "Because We Believe (Ama Credi E Vai)". He chose to be part of Team Christina Aguilera, on whose team he had hoped to be selected from the start. Mann was ultimately placed fourth, behind winner Jermaine Paul, runner-up Juliet Simms, and third-place finisher Tony Lucca. However, it was enough to give him a ready fan base and a recording contract with Universal Republic, ultimately releasing his debut solo album, Roads.

Recording 
Roads is a vocal pop, classical crossover and traditional pop album, featuring covers, as well as new songs. The first track and lead single is a brand new song, also called "Roads". Lyrically, it talks about staying on your own path while dealing with life’s uncertainties. Mann also received co-writing credits on some songs such as "Cuore", co-written by Savan Kotecha and Marco Marinangeli, and on "Falling", co-written by Liz Rose and Keith Thomas.

Mann also covered a handful of tracks. He covered three recent hit tracks: Lady Antebellum's "Need You Now", Damien Rice's "The Blower's Daughter" (which features his coach on The Voice, Christina Aguilera) and Coldplay's "Viva La Vida" (which he already sang on The Voice). Mann also recorded three classics: Frank Sinatra's "My Way", "Always on My Mind" and "Ave Maria".

Critical reception 

Matt Collar of AllMusic gave the album 3 out of possible 5 stars, writing that Roads is "a languid, passionate, and well-produced album, and beautifully showcases Mann's Vanderbilt University-trained vocal chops. Rather than attempt to shoe horn Mann's mature vocal aesthetic into a younger, teen- or dance-oriented sound, here we get a selection of thoughtful covers and originals that straddle the line between measured, adult contemporary radio styles and more of a classical crossover approach." Collar also wrote that the covers, such as "Need You Now" and "The Blower's Daughter", "rachet up the sweeping, cinematic qualities of the songs while allowing him plenty of room to shine." By the end of the review, he concluded that "Ultimately, Roads will not disappoint fans who championed Mann on The Voice."

Track listing

Charts
The album debuted at number 188 on the Billboard 200 chart, also debuting at number 4 on the Top Heatseekers chart.

References

2012 albums
Albums produced by Marius de Vries